Rule is an unincorporated community in Carroll County, Arkansas, United States. The community is located on Arkansas Highway 103 on the banks of Osage Creek and about four miles south of Green Forest.

References

Unincorporated communities in Carroll County, Arkansas
Unincorporated communities in Arkansas